Margit Pörtner (16 February 1972 – 26 April 2017) was a Danish curler and Olympic medalist. She received a silver medal at the 1998 Winter Olympics in Nagano. She received two medals at the World Curling Championships, and is European champion from 1994.

References

External links

1972 births
2017 deaths
Danish female curlers
Curlers at the 1998 Winter Olympics
Olympic silver medalists for Denmark
Olympic curlers of Denmark
Olympic medalists in curling
Medalists at the 1998 Winter Olympics
European curling champions
Deaths from cancer in Denmark
20th-century Danish women